The 1973 All-Atlantic Coast Conference football team consists of American football players chosen by the Atlantic Coast Sports Writers Association (ACS) as the best at each position in Atlantic Coast Conference ("ACC") during the 1973 NCAA Division I football season.

All-Atlantic Coast Conference selections

Offensive selections

Wide receivers
 Harrison Davis, Virginia (ACS [wide receiver])

Tight ends
 Charles Waddell, North Carolina (ACS [tight end])

Offensive tackles
 Rick Druschel, NC State (ACS)
 Robert Pratt, North Carolina (ACS)

Offensive guards
 Bill Yoest, NC State (ACS)
 Ken Peeples, Clemson (ACS)

Centers
 Paul Ryczek, Virginia (ACS)

Quarterbacks
 Ken Pengitore, Clemson (ACS)

Backs
 Willie Burden, NC State (ACS)
 Sammy Johnson, North Carolina (ACS)
 Louis Carter, Maryland (ACS)

Defensive selections

Linemen
 Paul Vellano, Maryland (ACS)
 Randy White, Maryland (ACS)
 John Ricca, Duke (ACS)
 Ernie Clark, Duke (ACS)

Linebackers
 Dick Ambrose, Virginia (ACS)
 Keith Stoneback, Duke (ACS)
 Jimmy DeRatt, North Carolina (ACS)

Defensive backs
 Bob Smith, Maryland (ACS)
 Mike Stultz, NC State (ACS)
 Peanut Martin, Clemson (ACS)
 Bobby Pilz, NC State (ACS)

Special teams

Kickers
 Chuck Ramsey, Wake Forest (ACS)

Key
ACS = Atlantic Coast Sports Writers Association

See also
1973 College Football All-America Team

References

All-Atlantic Coast Conference football team
All-Atlantic Coast Conference football teams